= Red Vietnam =

Red Vietnam may refer to:

- Democratic Republic of Vietnam
- Socialist Republic of Vietnam
